Yunlin County legislative districts consist of 2 single-member constituencies, each represented by a member of the Republic of China Legislative Yuan.

Current districts
Yunlin County Constituency 1 - Mailiao, Taixi, Dongshi, Baozhong, Tuku, Huwei, Sihu, Yuanchang, Kouhu, Shuilin, Beigang Townships
Yunlin County Constituency 2 - Lunbei, Erlun, Xiluo, Cihtong, Linnei, Dapi, Dounan, Gukeng Townships, Douliu City

Legislators

 Chang Sho-wen resigned in 2009 due to election fraud.

Election results

2020

2016

References

Constituencies in Taiwan
Yunlin County